Mucor hiemalis f. silvaticus is a fungal plant pathogen.

References

External links 
 Index Fungorum
 USDA ARS Fungal Database

Fungal plant pathogens and diseases
Mucoraceae
Fungi described in 1973